Mushobekwa is a surname. Notable people with the surname include:

Marie-Ange Mushobekwa, Congolese politician
Prospère Mushobekwa, Congolese politician

Surnames of African origin